Patricia H. Vance (born March 19, 1936) is a Republican politician. She served as a Pennsylvania State Senator from the 31st district from 2005 to 2016. Prior to that, she served as a member of the Pennsylvania House of Representatives from the 87th district from 1991 to 2004.

She served as Recorder of Deeds in Cumberland County, Pennsylvania from  1978 to 1990. Prior to elective office she was a surgical pediatric nurse in the Harrisburg Hospital.

On September 24, 2014, Vance voted against Pennsylvania senate bill SB1182 which would legalize medical cannabis in Pennsylvania.

References

External links
Pennsylvania State Senate - Pat Vance official PA Senate website

1936 births
Living people
American nurses
American women nurses
American Presbyterians
Republican Party Pennsylvania state senators
Politicians from Williamsport, Pennsylvania
People from Mechanicsburg, Pennsylvania
Republican Party members of the Pennsylvania House of Representatives
Women state legislators in Pennsylvania
21st-century American politicians
21st-century American women politicians